Happiness in Darkness is the third studio album by the gothic/industrial metal band Gothminister, released 25 November 2008 through E-Wave Records.

Track listing

Tracks 3, 6, and 8 have additional vocals by Ragnhild Westgaard "Nell" Sigland
Live Video Clips are taken from M'Era Luna Festival 2006 in Hildesheim, Germany

Personnel
Band
Bjørn Alexander Brem - vocals
Eirik "Pezzmaur" Øien - Bass
Bjørn "Machine" Aadland - guitar
Glenn Nilsen - guitar
Levi Gawron - guitar
Christian Svendsen - drums
Tom Kalstad - keyboards

Production
Bjørn Alexander Brem - programming, recording (drums), producer
Peder Kjellsby - mixing, orchestral arrangements, programming (Additional)
Rico Darum - producer, recording, programming (Additional)
Glenn Nilsen - recording (guitar)
Bjørn Aadland - recording (guitar)
Ollis - recording (guitar)
Bengt Brattegaard - recording (drums)
Christian Svendsen - recording (drums)
Morten Lund - mastering
Sebastian Ludvigsen - cover 
Trine + Kim Design Studio - design, layout, cover

References

Gothminister albums
2008 albums